Volker Eckert (1 July 1959 – 2 July 2007) was a German serial killer, who killed six women in East Germany, France and Spain, between 1974 and 2006. Eckert confessed to only six murders, five of whom were sex workers, but is known to have killed at least nine women, and is also accused of committing additional murders of women in several European countries including Italy and the Czech Republic, but investigations were closed after Eckert committed suicide during his criminal proceedings on July 2, 2007.

Biography 

Volker Eckert was born on 1 July 1959 in Plauen. He was the eldest of a family of three children. His mother expelled his father from their apartment in the 1960s.

In 1968, aged 9, Volker experienced sexual arousal from stroking the hair of one of his sister's dolls. He continued to explore his sexual interest in hair with his sister’s dolls and some of his mother’s wigs stored in their attic. Eventually, he would target women with the long, luxuriant hair he began to fetishize with dolls and wigs in childhood.

In 1968 and 1969, having precocious puberty, Volker dare not tell his classmates about his premature puberty, for fear of being laughed at and misunderstood. He then imagined that all the people who came before him would react like him.

At the beginning of the 1970s, Volker's "scenario" took on enormous proportions, even going as far as his own dolls. He amplified his "scenario" because he believed that no woman would let him touch her hair.

During the 1973-1974 school year, when he was 14, Volker Eckert spotted several of his long-haired classmates, in order to strangle them and stroke their hair afterwards.

Murders 
On 7 May 1974, Volker Eckert (14 years-old) lured a classmate Silvia Unterdörfel into her attic and strangled her with a curtain cord. But when his victim resisted, Eckert strangled her harder, and Silvia died from her injuries. Once his victim was dead, Eckert stroked her hair and disguised her murder as suicide by hanging a cord around her neck and on the doorknob. The case would be classified as suicide and Eckert was not perturbed by the killing. Barely 15 years old, Eckert would live with the secret of the murder for more than 32 years.

In 1975, Eckert worked with his father as a painter. He nevertheless wandered the streets of Plauen during the night, looking for "suitable women", according to his words.

In 1977, aged 18, Eckert was arrested again after being caught one night strangling a woman in the street. He was jailed for this sexual assault but for only eight months. He also confessed to Dr Nedopil that, knowing that the police had his DNA, Eckert said he was relieved to be arrested in the event of a repeat offense. He was released from prison in 1978. He was 19 at the time.

Between 1979 and 1987, Volker Eckert began attacking around thirty different women in the dark streets of Plauen. During his acting out, Eckert throttled his victims but did not kill any of them. It worked by leaving them unconscious. When his parents died, Eckert tried to distract himself by taking care of his younger sister and his brother. He confessed to the psychiatrist that this was "the only valid thing" in which he succeeded. Soon after, Eckert's siblings were taken to live with their aunt, her detention having started to crumble and to the best of her memory, over the next eight years.

In April 1987, a murder was committed in Plauen: the lifeless body of Heike Wunderlich, 18, was found in the woods of Plauen. The young girl was strangled and stripped naked. The murder of Wunderlich was presumed unrelated to the assaults of Eckert, as the victim was murdered. The affair was closed without continuation and Eckert would never be worried for the murder.

At the end of 1987, Eckert committed another violent assault on a teenage girl. That evening, 16-year-old Claudia was walking through the streets of Plauen. Eckert spotted her and decided to follow her discreetly. Eckert approached Claudia, then threw himself on her. A fight took place and Eckert strangled her, then strokes her hair. Following his new incident, Eckert left, leaving Claudia unconscious. When she woke up, Claudia complained and sketched a portrait. When the composite portrait was distributed, Dr Nedopil formally recognized the face of a man he has examined in the past: Volker Eckert, aged 28. Knowing that Eckert is known to the police for acts of sexual assault, Dr Nedopil warns the Plauen police station. Eckert was arrested for the attempted murder committed on Claudia and then remanded in custody.

In 1988, Eckert was tried for the murder attempt on Claudia. He was then 29 years old. At the end of his judgment, Eckert was found guilty of attempted murder and sentenced to 12 years in prison. While in detention, Eckert received only a few hours of therapy from a psychologist who has heard of his sexual fantasies. But it was concluded that Volker Eckert could be released without problem.

In July 1994, Eckert was thus released from prison, after 6 and a half years of detention. Eckert became a truck driver in 1999. He used his truck to attract prostitutes and thus rediscover his "childish fantasy" His victims worked as sex workers in these countries between 2001 and 2006: 
 June 25, 2001, a Nigerian sex worker near Chermignac, near the city of Bordeaux in western France
 October 9, 2001, a 24-year-old sex worker in Maçanet de la Selva, Catalonia, Spain
 March 1, 2005, a Russian sex worker in Sant Sadurní d'Osormort, Catalonia, Spain
 October 2, 2006, a 28-year-old Polish sex worker at Reims, France
 November 2, 2006, a 20-year-old Bulgarian sex worker in Hostalric, in Catalonia, Spain

In most cases, Eckert strangled the women, performed amateur post mortems on them, and finally photographed them. In addition, he cut off the hair or dressed the dead bodies and kept them in the cab of his truck or in his apartment.

Unconfirmed murders 
Eckert is believed to have committed at least seven additional murders across Europe, including:
 April 1987, an 18-year-old in Plauen, East Germany
 August 2002: a 23-year-old sex worker from Sierra Leone in Troyes, France
 5 September 2004: a 25-year-old Ghanaian sex worker in Rezzato, Italy
 Four other women, three of them in the Czech Republic and one in France, according to the police in those countries

Arrest 
Following the murder on 2 November 2006, footage caught by a surveillance camera showing Eckert's truck next to the naked corpse of his victim, which was located beside the parking lot, was reported to the Spanish police. Eckert could be identified via the truck, and a few weeks later German police detained him in Wesseling, near Cologne, on 17 November 2006. The police found tufts of hair and pictures of his victims subjected to various tortures in Eckert's truck and in his house. During the interrogations, Eckert acknowledged committing six murders, the five sex workers in France and Spain, and that of his classmate in Germany.

Death 
On July 1, 2007, while awaiting trial, Eckert committed suicide on 2 July 2007, in the middle of criminal proceedings against him, and was found dead in his cell in Bayreuth, Bavaria.

Media
Eckert's case was covered in the 3rd episode of World's Most Evil Killers.

See also
 List of German serial killers

References

Further reading 

1959 births
2007 suicides
20th-century German criminals
21st-century German criminals
German male criminals
German murderers of children
German people who died in prison custody
German serial killers
Male serial killers
Murder committed by minors
People convicted of attempted murder
People from Plauen
Prisoners who died in German detention
Serial killers who committed suicide in prison custody
Suicides by hanging in Germany
Truck drivers